Trenchcoat is a 1983 American action comedy film directed by Michael Tuchner and starring Margot Kidder and Robert Hays. It was produced by Walt Disney Productions during an era that focused on releasing strongly adult-oriented films, including The Black Hole, Condorman, The Devil and Max Devlin, Escape to Witch Mountain and its 1978 sequel, Never Cry Wolf, Night Crossing, Return to Oz, Something Wicked This Way Comes, Tex, Tron, The Watcher in the Woods, and the international distribution of Dragonslayer.

Because of the film's limited promotion and mostly negative reviews, Trenchcoat is among the most forgotten Disney films and is one of the most difficult to find.

Synopsis 

When aspiring mystery writer Mickey Raymond (Margot Kidder) travels to Malta to research her first novel, she finds herself falling in love with Terry (Robert Hays), a handsome, mysterious American. She also finds herself falling into a conspiracy of events, apparently fuelled as much by her vivid author's imagination as real-life events. David Suchet plays a local police official who seemingly is one step behind these events. Raymond sees it as her odd luck when she becomes embroiled in an international plutonium smuggling ring, and comic chaos ensues. Weary of playing victim, she turns detective to investigate not only the source of her bad luck, but also to find out who the real culprits are. At the end, Terry and Mickey stay together, sealing their relationship with a kiss in the dark.

Cast 
 Margot Kidder as Mickey Raymond, the writer 
 Robert Hays as Terry Leonard, the spy
 Gila von Weitershausen as Eva Werner
 Daniel Faraldo as Nino Tenucci, Mickey's taxi driver
 Ronald Lacey as Princess Aida
 John Justin as Marquis De Pena
 Leopoldo Trieste as Esteban Ortega
 Jennifer Darling as Laurie 
 Kevork Malikyan as the Arab who kidnaps Mickey
 Vic Tablian as Achmed

Production
In February 1981, it was reported that producer Jerry Leider planned a “$10-million comedy-thriller,” using the working title, Malta Wants Me Dead, to be released by EMI. 
 After Leider's association with EMI ended, he brought the project to Disney, encouraged by the company’s recent interest in working with independent producers. He gave a copy of the screenplay to Disney production chief Tom Wilhite on the Friday before a holiday weekend, and an agreement was reached the following Tuesday. The $8-million production boasted an international cast and crew representing such countries as the U.S., Canada, England, Italy, Germany, France, and Malta. Trenchcoat marked Leider’s first release through Disney, whose distributor, Buena Vista Distribution Company, planned a release for early 1983. Filming locations included the cities of Valletta, Mdina, and Rabat, and several landmarks, including the Hagar Qim Temples, Verdala Castle, the Grand Master Palace Armoury, St. Paul’s Catacombs, the Floriana market, the Gozo ferry, and the Grand Harbour. Eight weeks of photography in Malta would be followed by another week in San Francisco, CA. With Ronald Lacey as Princess Aida, a 1982 article in Variety noted Trenchcoat may have been the first Disney release to feature an openly homosexual character.

Release 
The film was produced by Walt Disney Productions but was uncredited, due to its adult themes. Trenchcoat, Never Cry Wolf, and the international distribution of Dragonslayer are widely regarded as the films that led to the launch of Touchstone Pictures on February 15, 1984.

The film was released on March 11, 1983 at movie theatres. It was released by Walt Disney Telecommunications and Non-Theatrical Company under the Walt Disney Home Video label on VHS and Betamax in 1983 and was released by CreateSpace Receiving under the Buena Vista Home Entertainment label on DVD on January 31, 2012.

Unlike some other 1980s films such as The Journey of Natty Gann, Condorman, and Something Wicked This Way Comes, Trenchcoat doesn't have a soundtrack that has been released yet by Intrada Records.

Reception 

The film was a box office failure, earning only a total of $4,304,286 domestically.

The film has been received negatively. Siskel and Ebert named it one of the "Stinkers of 1983".

References

External links 
  
 
 
 

Films directed by Michael Tuchner
1983 films
1980s action comedy films
Walt Disney Pictures films
Films set in Malta
Films shot in Malta
American action comedy films
American mystery films
Films scored by Charles Fox
Films with screenplays by Jeffrey Price and Peter S. Seaman
1983 comedy films
1980s English-language films
1980s American films